The 2012 United States Senate election in Missouri was held on November 6, 2012, concurrently with the 2012 presidential election, other elections to the United States Senate in other states, as well as elections to the United States House of Representatives and various state and local elections.

Incumbent U.S. Senator Claire McCaskill was unopposed in the Democratic primary and U.S. Representative Todd Akin won the Republican nomination with a plurality in a close three-way race. 

Years prior, many forecasters considered Claire McCaskill to be the most vulnerable Democratic senator seeking re-election in 2012 due to the state's rightward shift. However, the election received considerable media coverage due to controversial comments made by eventual nominee, Todd Akin, most notably his claim that women can't get pregnant from rape.
McCaskill was comfortably re-elected to a second term with backlash against Akin from suburban women being cited as the main reason. , this was the last time the Democrats won a U.S. Senate election in Missouri.

Background 
In 2006, Claire McCaskill was elected with 49.6% of the vote, narrowly defeating Republican incumbent Jim Talent.

Democratic primary 
Incumbent U.S. Senator Claire McCaskill ran unopposed in the Democratic primary election.

Candidates 
 Claire McCaskill, incumbent U.S. Senator

Results

Republican primary 
The Republican primary election for the United States Senate in Missouri, held on August 7, 2012, was one of the three most anticipated of summer 2012. This was due to the projected closeness of the Federal races in the 'Show-Me State' in November 2012, and the potential to change the control of the Senate in January 2013. Democrats believed that Todd Akin would be the weakest among the likely challengers for the Senate seat, and ads attacking him as "too conservative" were largely viewed as a veiled support for his nomination.

Candidates

Declared 
 Todd Akin, U.S. Representative
 Jerry Beck
 John Brunner, businessman
 Mark Lodes
 Hector Maldonado
 Mark Memoly, author and businessman
 Robert Poole
 Sarah Steelman, former State Treasurer, former state senator and candidate for Governor in 2008

Declined 
 Jo Ann Emerson, U.S. Representative
 Sam Graves, U.S. Representative
 Peter Kinder, Lieutenant Governor (running for reelection)
 Blaine Luetkemeyer, U.S. Representative
 Ed Martin, attorney (running for Missouri Attorney General)
 Tom Schweich, State Auditor
 Jim Talent, former U.S. Senator
 Ann Wagner, former U.S. Ambassador to Luxembourg and former Missouri Republican Party chairwoman (running for Congress)

Endorsements

Polling

Results

Libertarian  primary 
Jonathan Dine ran unopposed in the Libertarian primary election.

Candidates 
 Jonathan Dine, personal trainer and nominee for the U.S. Senate in 2010

Results

General election

Candidates 
 Claire McCaskill (Democratic), incumbent U.S. Senator
 Todd Akin (Republican), U.S. Representative
 Jonathan Dine (Libertarian), personal trainer

Debates 
The first debate was held on September 21 in Columbia, Missouri and was sponsored by the Missouri Press Association. Topics discussed by the three candidates included the Affordable Care Act, the future of the U.S. Postal Service, the rapid rise of college tuition, and Representative Akin's controversial comments on rape.

The second and final debate was held October 18 in St. Louis. It was sponsored by the Clayton Chamber of Commerce and hosted by television station KSDK, public radio station KWMU and the St. Louis Business Journal.
External links
Complete video of debate, September 21, 2012 - C-SPAN
Complete video of debate, October 18, 2012 - C-SPAN

Rape and pregnancy controversy 

While making remarks on rape and abortion on August 19, 2012, Akin made the claim that women victims of what he described as "legitimate rape" rarely experience pregnancy from rape. In an interview aired on St. Louis television station KTVI-TV, Akin was asked his views on whether women who became pregnant due to rape should have the option of abortion. He replied:

Well you know, people always want to try to make that as one of those things, well how do you, how do you slice this particularly tough sort of ethical question. First of all, from what I understand from doctors, that's really rare. If it's a legitimate rape, the female body has ways to try to shut that whole thing down.
But let's assume that maybe that didn’t work or something. I think there should be some punishment, but the punishment ought to be on the rapist and not attacking the child.

The comments from Akin almost immediately led to an uproar, with the term "legitimate rape" being taken to imply belief in a view that some kinds of rape are "legitimate", or, alternatively, that victims who do become pregnant from rape are likely to be lying about their claims. His claims about the likelihood of pregnancy resulting from rape were widely seen as being based on long-discredited pseudoscience, with experts seeing the claims as lacking medical validity. Akin was not the first to make such claims, but was perhaps one of the most prominent. While some voices such as Iowa congressman Steve King supported Akin, senior figures in both parties condemned his remarks and some Republicans called for him to resign. In the resulting furor, Akin received widespread calls to drop out of his Senate race from both Republicans and Democrats. Akin apologized after making the comment, saying he "misspoke", and he stated he planned to remain in the Senate race. This response was itself attacked by many commentators who saw the initial comments as representative of his long-held views, rather than an accidental gaffe.

The comment was widely characterized as misogynistic and recklessly inaccurate, with many commentators remarking on the use of the words "legitimate rape". Related news articles cited a 1996 article in an obstetrics and gynecology journal, which found that 5% of women who were raped became pregnant, which equaled about 32,000 pregnancies each year in the US alone.  A separate 2003 article in the journal Human Nature estimated that rapes are twice as likely to result in pregnancies as consensual sex.  (See also pregnancy from rape.)

The incident was seen as having an impact upon the Republicans' chances of gaining a majority in the U.S. Senate by making news in the week before the 2012 Republican National Convention and by "shift[ing] the national discussion to divisive social issues that could repel swing voters rather than economic issues that could attract them" to the Republican Party. Akin, along with other Republican candidates with controversial positions on rape, lost due to backlash from women voters.

Other controversies 
On October 20, at a fundraiser, Akin compared McCaskill to a dog. After being criticized, Akin's campaign aide wrote on his official Twitter page that if Claire McCaskill "were a dog, she’d be a ‘Bullshitsu.’" The aide later said that he was joking.
Akin was caught on tape commenting that "Sen. Claire McCaskill goes to Washington, D.C., to ‘fetch' higher taxes and regulations."

Fundraising

Top contributors

Top industries

Predictions

Polling 

Republican primary

General election

Results 
Even though the last poll before the election showed Akin only losing by four percentage points, McCaskill defeated him handily, by a 15.7% margin of victory and a vote margin of 427,966. Both McCaskill and incumbent Governor Jay Nixon, running at the same time, were able to get a large number of votes from rural parts of the state, something President Barack Obama was not able to do. McCaskill and Nixon were declared the winners of their respective races even before results from the known big Democratic strongholds of St. Louis and Kansas City came in. Akin conceded defeat to McCaskill at 10:38 P.M. Central Time.

Time featured the race in an article on the Senate. The article mentioned that McCaskill had been fading in pre-election polls, and that she was considered the most vulnerable/endangered Democratic incumbent in 2012. However, Akin's controversial comments helped McCaskill rise in the polls and propelled her to a victory in the election. In August 2015, McCaskill penned a Politico article in which she stated that in 2012, she had "successfully manipulated the Republican primary so that in the general election [she] would face the candidate [she] was most likely to beat."

See also 
 2012 United States Senate elections
 2012 United States House of Representatives elections in Missouri
 2012 United States presidential election in Missouri
 2012 Missouri gubernatorial election
 2012 Missouri lieutenant gubernatorial election
 2012 Missouri Attorney General election
 2012 Missouri State Treasurer election
 2012 Missouri Secretary of State election

References

External links 
 Elections from the Missouri Secretary of State
 Campaign contributions at OpenSecrets.org
 Outside spending at the Sunlight Foundation
 Candidate issue positions at On the Issues
 United States Senate elections in Missouri, 2012 at Ballotpedia

Official campaign websites
 Todd Akin for U.S. Senate
 Claire McCaskill for U.S. Senate
 Jonathan Dine for U.S. Senate

United States Senate
Missouri
2012